Pa Sak is a tambon (subdistrict) of Mueang Lamphun District, in Lamphun Province, Thailand. In 2019 it had a total population of 14,385 people.

Administration

Central administration
The tambon is subdivided into 18 administrative villages (muban).

Local administration
The whole area of the subdistrict is covered by the subdistrict municipality (Thesaban Tambon) Pa Sak (เทศบาลตำบลป่าสัก).

References

External links
Thaitambon.com on Pa Sak

Tambon of Lamphun province
Populated places in Lamphun province